The Julius Grey house is a historical building in downtown Bydgoszcz, at 35 Gdańska Street.

Location
The building stands on the west side of Gdańska Street between Dworcowa and Śniadeckich streets.

History

Origins
The investor was Julius Grey, a baker, which ran there a bakery then a confectionery factory in 1883. At this time, the address was 23 Danzigerstraße

Juilius Grey decided to have this place rebuilt and asked, in 1887, master builder Hermann Lewandowski, living at 13 Louisenstrasse (now Hetmanska street) to manage the project. The same Lewandowski will later support the building of the grand edifice at 1 Plac Wolności.

In 1909, the house has been rebuilt, designed by Rudolf Kern. This architect had already realized several edifices renovation in Bromberg:
 a tenement at 5 Gdańska street in the same year;
 houses in Gdanska street (at 66-68, 67 & 158);
 a tenement at 10 Cieszkowskiego Street in 1902-1903.

Pastry shop
During interwar period, the Grey family ran on the groung floor a pastry shop, see advertisement picture in the gallery), which was famous for the quality of its cakes.

Stanislaw Hass, a pastry chef who had been running café Cristal at 1 Freedom Square,
moved to the former premises of the Grey family, at 35 Gdańska street, where part of the Grey's equipment and stocks were still available.
Until 2003, the "Cristal" cafe with its typical Art Nouveau décor has been located here, even when the Hass family moved the pastry in the 1960s.

Architecture
The building was built in the style of Eclecticism using forms of German Historicism.

The edifice is remarkable by two symmetric rounded shape balconies with forged railings: they both enclose the large bay window standing above the entrance gate.

Window pediments are decorated with figure of a woman head.

Gallery

See also

 Bydgoszcz
 Gdanska Street in Bydgoszcz
 Rudolf Kern
  Downtown district in Bydgoszcz

References

External links
   City archives related to the Hass family

Bibliography
  

Buildings and structures on Gdańska Street, Bydgoszcz
Residential buildings completed in 1887